Ippazio is a masculine Italian given name. Notable people with the name include:

Ippazio Antonio Bortone (1847–1938), Italian sculptor
Ippazio Stefano (born 1945), Italian politician and physician

Italian masculine given names